Julie Anne Merkell (née Harris; born 26 May 1972), known professionally as Patsy Palmer, is an English actress and DJ, known for her roles as Natasha in the children's drama series Grange Hill (1985–1987), and Bianca Jackson in the BBC soap opera EastEnders (1993–1999, 2008–2014, 2019), which earned her the British Soap Award for Best Actress.

Early life 
Palmer was born and grew up in Bethnal Green, East London. She attended Globe Primary School and then Haggerston Girls Secondary School.

She was brought up along with her two elder brothers, Albert and Harry, by her mother Pat. She also has half siblings named Georgia and Berty. Her mother first spotted her acting talent and encouraged her to go to Anna Scher's acting school in London. Palmer was bullied at school, and has said that acting was a form of escape. At age six, she appeared in a West End production of Joseph and the Amazing Technicolor Dreamcoat.

Career

Early career
Upon enrolling at the Anna Scher Theatre school, and learning about an accomplished actress already with the name Julie Harris, Palmer adopted her current name by using her mother's maiden name and changing her given name to her mother's pet name, Patsy. Palmer made her screen debut in the television programme The Gentle Touch in 1984. Like many other EastEnders actors, Palmer appeared on the children's drama show Grange Hill between 1985 and 1987. She went on to have small roles in BBC's Tricky Business (1989), Making News (1990), Clarissa (1991), Love Hurts (1992), Drop the Dead Donkey (1993), and The Bill (1993), and she also appeared as an acne-ridden teenager in a Clearasil advert.

EastEnders

In 1993, she was cast in the role of feisty Bianca Jackson in BBC's soap opera, EastEnders. Bianca's on-screen marriage to Ricky Butcher (Sid Owen) in 1997 drew one of the biggest soap audiences ever — more than 22 million. She remained in the role for six years, but quit in 1999 to spend more time with her family and to concentrate on other projects. She reprised the role in May 2002 in a special entitled, EastEnders: Ricky and Bianca. The two-part, hour-long special was filmed in Manchester, which reunited Bianca and Ricky for the first time in over two years.

In 2005, Palmer publicly criticised EastEnders, branding the storylines ridiculous and unbelievable and stating that she "wouldn't go back to EastEnders". However, in October 2007 the BBC announced that Palmer would be returning to the soap as a full-time character; she made her comeback on-screen in April 2008. Palmer has commented "I can't wait to explore what Bianca has been doing with her life and seeing what she is going to get up to next", and EastEnders executive producer, Diederick Santer, added, "I'm delighted to welcome Patsy Palmer home to EastEnders. Bianca is one of the most popular characters the show has ever had". In 2014, Palmer announced that she was leaving the series. She reprised the role again in the autumn of 2019 for a short stint. In February 2020, it was announced that Palmer would be reprising her role as Bianca again, with scenes set to air later in the year. However, this was later cancelled due to the Coronavirus pandemic restrictions.

Other work
Palmer made a guest appearance on the Christmas Day 1993 episode of Top of the Pops introducing 'No Limit' by 2 Unlimited with presenter Mark Franklin.

Palmer worked on the first series of OK TV with Fiona Phillips in 1999. In the first episode of the series she was shown at a beauty salon where she got her hair shampooed and interviewed Lindsay Coulson, who played her fictional mother Carol Jackson in EastEnders. In 1999, Palmer made a cameo appearance as herself in an episode of Kathy Burke's sitcom, Gimme Gimme Gimme; it made light of her role as Bianca Jackson. She appeared as Clare in the detective series McCready and Daughter, which aired for a pilot and one series between 2000 and 2001. She made an appearance in He Knew He Was Right for the BBC in 2004, and in 2001 she was seen in the television mini-series Do or Die, which aired on Sky One.

On stage she has starred in the one-woman musical Tell Me On A Sunday, which toured the UK, and played in London's West End. She also had a leading role in a UK tour of the musical Steppin' Out, appeared in the original West End run of Mum's the Word, and acted in We Happy Few by Imogen Stubbs, which played a short run at the Gielgud Theatre.

Palmer stood in for GMTVs Lorraine Kelly, presenting her  Lorraine Live section for a week in 1999, reporting from Miami on fashion, lifestyle, health and fitness. She has also co-hosted Channel 4's Big Breakfast as a guest presenter for a week. Palmer has released a number of hit fitness videos and DVDs: Patsy Palmer – The Club Workout (2000), Patsy Palmer – The Urban Workout (2002) and Patsy Palmer's Ibiza Workout (2002). In 2006 Palmer made an appearance in the charity fitness DVD The Allstar Workout. Palmer's film work includes the shorts Love Story (1999) directed by Nick Love, and Another Green World (2005) directed by Peter Chipping.

In 2005, Palmer took part in BBC's Strictly Come Dancing show, to raise money for the Children in Need fund. She has also made a cameo appearance with Catherine Tate's sketch show The Catherine Tate Show. In February 2007, she was a jury member on the BBC programme The Verdict, where various celebrities ruled on a contemporary and controversial case, based on evidence and examples from real life.

Palmer's autobiography All of Me was released in the UK on 5 April 2007. In the book, she described her ascent to fame, her struggle with addiction and how she battled to overcome her problems. In 2003, in addition to acting, Palmer and her friend, Charlotte Cutler went into business with marketer Ken Wells and a Kent-based chemical company, to create "Palmer Cutler", selling beauty and self-tanning products.

In 2008, a short film starring Palmer was released by housing and homelessness charity Shelter. Palmer has been DJing since 2012, including in United States since 2017. In January 2020, Palmer appeared as the Butterfly on the ITV reality singing competition The Masked Singer. In March, Palmer participated in the third series of The Great Stand Up to Cancer Bake Off. In December, she appeared as a guest on The One Show in an episode dedicated to the late Barbara Windsor. In 2023, Palmer was a contestant on the fifteenth series of Dancing on Ice. She was paired with Matt Evers and the pair were fourth to be eliminated.

Awards and nominations1996: Nominated 'Most Popular Actress' at the National Television Awards2000: Won 'Best Actress' at the TV Quick/TV Choice Awards
 Won 'Best Actress' at the Inside Soap Awards
 Won 'Best Actress' at The British Soap Awards
 Nominated 'Best On-Screen Partnership alongside Sid Owen at The British Soap Awards2008: Nominated 'Best Storyline' at the Inside Soap Awards for "Bianca's Return"2009: Nominated 'Favorite Soap Actress' at the TRIC Awards
 Nominated 'Best Dramatic Performance' at the British Soap Awards.2010:'''
 Nominated 'Best On-Screen Partnership' alongside Sid Owen at the British Soap Awards

 Personal life 
Palmer is close friends with Sid Owen (Ricky Butcher) and Danniella Westbrook (Sam Mitchell). Palmer has been married twice and has four children: Charley (born 1992) (from Palmer's relationship with boxer Alfie Rothwell), Fenton (born 2000), Emilia (born 2001), and Bertie (born 2010). For 10 years, starting in 2004, she lived with her husband and children in Western Terrace and then Kemptown, Brighton, England. Her brother, Harry Harris, is married to Lindsey Coulson, the actress who played her on-screen mother Carol Jackson in EastEnders. In April 2014, Palmer and most of her family moved to Malibu, California, near Los Angeles. Since then she made friends with the likes of Camille Grammer and Cindy Crawford while settling down.

Palmer has said that she has been a drug- and alcohol-addict, and that during her 1990s stint on EastEnders'' she frequently turned up on set either high or hungover. She has said that she started experimenting with alcohol and drugs from the age of 10 and her addiction lasted for 24 years. In 2010, she stated that she had been clean of drugs and alcohol since September 2004 and that "We don't have drink in our house".

Palmer suffered from bullying during her school years. Because of this she lent her support to the Department for Education's anti-bullying campaign in 2000. She is an active patron of Children's Cancer Charity CLIC Sargent.

Palmer's late father, Albert Harris, was Irish.

See also
 List of Strictly Come Dancing contestants

References

External links
 

1972 births
Living people
English people of Irish descent
English stage actresses
English soap opera actresses
English television actresses
English radio actresses
People from Bethnal Green
Actresses from London
Alumni of the Anna Scher Theatre School
English DJs
Women DJs
21st-century English women musicians